Emanuel Miller (born June 19, 2000) is a Canadian college basketball player for the TCU Horned Frogs of the Big 12 Conference. He previously played for the Texas A&M Aggies.

Early life and high school career
Miller began his high school career at Bill Crothers Secondary School. Prior to his junior season, he transferred to La Lumiere School. Miller transferred to Prolific Prep for his senior season. In October 2018, he committed to Virginia Tech over offers from Maryland, Minnesota, and Buffalo. After Buzz Williams accepted the head coaching position at Texas A&M, Miller followed him to play for the Aggies.

College career
Miller averaged 6.4 points and 6.3 rebounds per game as a freshman. On January 26, 2021, he scored a career-high 28 points in a 78–54 loss to South Carolina. As a sophomore, Miller averaged 16.2 points and 8.2 rebounds per game. Following the season, he transferred to TCU, citing the desire of a fresh start.

National team career
Miller has represented Canada in several international competitions. In July 2017, he competed for the Canada team that won a gold medal at the FIBA U19 World Cup. Miller averaged 1.6 points and 1.7 rebounds per game. In June 2018, he was a key piece for the Canada team that captured a silver medal at the FIBA U18 Americas Championship. Miller averaged 17.3 points, 7.3 rebounds, 1.5 assists and 1.2 steals per game. In the semifinal win against Puerto Rico, he posted 31 points and 14 rebounds.

Career statistics

College

|-
| style="text-align:left;"| 2019–20
| style="text-align:left;"| Texas A&M
| 30 || 25 || 24.6 || .404 || .143 || .617 || 6.3 || .9 || .7 || .1 || 6.4
|-
| style="text-align:left;"| 2020–21
| style="text-align:left;"| Texas A&M
| 17 || 13 || 31.6 || .571 || .000 || .817 || 8.2 || 1.4 || .8 || .1 || 16.2
|- class="sortbottom"
| style="text-align:center;" colspan="2"| Career
| 47 || 38 || 27.2 || .491 || .111 || .717 || 7.0 || 1.1 || .7 || .1 || 9.9

References

External links
TCU Horned Frogs bio
Texas A&M Aggies bio

2000 births
Living people
Canadian men's basketball players
Canadian expatriate basketball people in the United States
Texas A&M Aggies men's basketball players
La Lumiere School alumni
Power forwards (basketball)
Small forwards